Stanislav Pelc (born 31 October 1955 in Skorotice, nowadays part of Ústí nad Labem) is a former Czechoslovak footballer.

Playing career
During his youth Stanislav Pelc played for Sokol Skorotice and Spartak Ústí nad Labem. In 1975, he transferred to Dukla Prague, where he stayed until 1986. For Dukla he reached a total of 240 top league appearances and scored 63 goals. In 1977, 1979 and 1982 he won  Czechoslovak First League and in 1981, 1983 and 1985 he won national cup. He spent the late years of his career playing in Cyprus for EPA Larnaca FC and in regional Austrian leagues.

For the national team of Czechoslovakia, Pelc played three matches.

References
 
 Hall of Fame Dukla Praha profile

1955 births
Living people
Czech footballers
Czechoslovak footballers
Czechoslovak expatriate footballers
Czechoslovakia international footballers
Dukla Prague footballers
Cypriot First Division players
Expatriate footballers in Cyprus
Czechoslovak expatriate sportspeople in Cyprus
Association football midfielders
Sportspeople from Ústí nad Labem